Luminal is the debut film from Italian director Andrea Vecchiato.

Named after the drug phenobarbitone, the film is based on the cult novel by Italian writer Isabella Santacroce. Santacroce's third novel, published in 2001, tells the story of teenagers caught up in the excesses of chemical culture. 

French actor Denis Lavant stars, having previously worked with director Leos Carax.

Influenced by French New Wave cinema and Japanese aesthetics, the film has been described as postmodern, unorthodox and unconventional in terms of filming technology employed.

It was co-produced by Leo Pescarolo who has also worked with Lars von Trier, Federico Fellini and Raoul Ruiz.

External links 
Creation Mag.com "The luma key"

Films based on Italian novels
2004 films
Italian drama films
2000s Italian films